Kyle Deshun Roberts (born February 9, 1992) is a former American football offensive tackle. He was signed with Broncos as an undrafted free agent in 2015. He played college football at the University of Nevada, Reno.

Professional career
After going unselected in the 2015 NFL draft, Roberts signed with the Denver Broncos on May 3, 2015. He was waived for final roster cuts before the start of the 2015 season, but signed with the Broncos' practice squad on September 7.

On February 7, 2016, Roberts was part of the Broncos team that won Super Bowl 50. In the game, the Broncos defeated the Carolina Panthers by a score of 24–10.

On August 30, 2016, Roberts was waived by the Broncos.

References

External links
Denver Broncos bio
Nevada Wolfpack bio

1992 births
Living people
American football offensive tackles
Denver Broncos players
Nevada Wolf Pack football players
Sportspeople from Sparks, Nevada
Players of American football from Nevada